Keilor Park is a suburb in Melbourne, Victoria, Australia,  north-west of Melbourne's Central Business District, located within the City of Brimbank local government area. Keilor Park recorded a population of 2,684 at the 2021 census.

Keilor Park is bounded in the west by the Maribyrnong River, Tullamarine and Melbourne Airport in the north, in the east by Steele Creek and in the south by the Calder Highway.

According to the 2001 ABS Census, 39% of the population is of Italian or Greek descent. The median age of the area is 37, though more of the population is below 35 or in their 50s. The most common sector of employment for men is manufacturing (25% of men) and for women retail (21% of women).

The suburb contains the Keilor Botanic Gardens.

Work force

Keilor Park is the destination zone with the greatest number (6,384) of workers employs 9.6% of the local workers within the City of Brimbank.

Demographics

According to data from the 2016 census:
 The most common ancestries in Keilor Park were Italian 24.8%, Australian 16.1%, English 15.3%, Irish 5.6% and Greek 4.7%.
 In Keilor Park, 62.5% of people were born in Australia. The most common countries of birth were Italy 11.9%, Greece 1.9%, England 1.6%, Malta 1.5% and India 1.3%.
 The most common responses for religion in Keilor Park were Catholic 49.6%, No Religion, so described 17.6%, Eastern Orthodox 7.5%, Not stated 7.5% and Anglican 5.7%. In Keilor Park, Christianity was the largest religious group reported overall (77.1%) (this figure excludes not stated responses).
 In Keilor Park, 60.3% of people only spoke English at home. Other languages spoken at home included Italian 17.2%, Greek 4.1%, Arabic 1.4%, Maltese 1.2% and Spanish 1.0%.

Transport

465 Essendon – Keilor Park via Buckley Street, Milleara SC, Keilor East (every day). Operated by Ryan Brothers Bus Service.
476 Moonee Ponds – Hillside via Essendon RS, Keilor, Watergardens SC, Watergardens RS (every day). Operated by Kastoria Bus Lines.

Sport

Keilor Park has a number of ovals and sports located in its area. Sports include cricket, football, softball, athletics, tennis, soccer, basketball.

Keilor Park Football Club, an Australian Rules football team, competes in the Essendon District Football League.

See also
 City of Keilor – Keilor Park was previously within this former local government area.

References

Suburbs of Melbourne
Suburbs of the City of Brimbank